Pencombe is a village in the Pencombe with Grendon Warren civil parish of Herefordshire, England.

A parish hall caters for community events and there are part time post office services provided every Tuesday (midday - 1pm) by a mobile unit. The village public house is the Wheelwright Arms. Parish population in 2017 was estimated to be 336.

St John's Church is constructed in the Norman style of soft local red sandstone, and replaces a medieval building on the same site. In 2009 a female parish priest was appointed. Across the road is the former parish hall, opened in the 1890s, now a private dwelling. Other village  buildings include  Pencombe Court and Pencombe Church of England Primary School, both adjacent to the church. Pencombe Hall, a private residential care home to the south of the village, with coach house, now a private dwelling, were built by John Arkwright, of Hampton Court  to the east, a descendant of Richard Arkwright.

Pencombe has a village cricket team, with no home ground, which plays Sunday friendly away games.

Trade directory extract for Pencombe from 1863: 

The New Zealand zoologist  Charles Chilton was born in Pencombe in 1860.

References

External links

Villages in Herefordshire